Anthony Sherrod Davis (born March 27, 1980) from Victoria, Virginia is a former American football offensive tackle. He was signed by the Tampa Bay Buccaneers as an undrafted free agent in 2003. He played college football at Virginia Tech.  Davis has also been signed to the St. Louis Rams and New Orleans Saints.  He was released by the San Diego Chargers on August 31, 2012.

References

External links
 San Diego Chargers profile
 Virginia Tech profile

1980 births
Living people
American football offensive guards
American football offensive tackles
Florida Tuskers players
Tampa Bay Buccaneers players
Virginia Tech Hokies football players
People from Victoria, Virginia
Players of American football from Paterson, New Jersey
Players of American football from Virginia
African-American players of American football
21st-century African-American sportspeople
20th-century African-American people